Cyriacus Wilche or Cyriakus Wilcke (ca.1620 - 26 April 1667 in Jena) was a German composer of the Baroque period.

Background 
Cyriacus Wilche worked as a musician at the court of Weimar until 1662. From 1662 until his death in 1667, he was employed as a musician in Jena. The godfather of one of his children was Bernhard II, Duke of Saxe-Jena.

He is best known today for his Battaglia for 2 violins, 2 violas and continuo. Possibly his only surviving work, it has survived in manuscript form as part of the Rost Codex.

Wilche was possibly the grandfather of Anna Magdalena Bach, the second wife of Johann Sebastian Bach.

References

External links
 

1620s births
1667 deaths
German Baroque composers
Year of birth uncertain